Free State of Schwenten, also known as Republic of Świętno (Polish: Republika Świętnieńska),  was an independent state proclaimed in 1919 with the capital in Schwenten. The declaration of independence had defensive role as local government was aware of the Polish uprising in Greater Poland. It existed for 7 months until it joined Weimar Republic.

References

States and territories established in 1919
States and territories disestablished in 1919
Former republics
Former countries in Europe
Former unrecognized countries
1919 in Germany